Fascination is a 1922 American silent drama film directed by Robert Z. Leonard and starring his then wife Mae Murray. The film is based on an original story by Edmund Goulding who was soon to be a prolific film director.

The story capitalizes on Murray's continuing forays into outlandish costume dramas. It is not known whether the film currently survives, suggesting that it is a lost film.

Plot
As described in a film magazine, Dolores de Lisa (Murray), born of a Spanish father and American mother, combines the warm blood of the South with Yankee pep. To hold her in restraint, her aunt Marquesa (Fitzroy) takes her to Madrid. Dolores slips away from home on Easter day when the streets are filled with crowds going to the bullfight where, after obtaining a wig and costume, she occupies a box. She becomes fascinated with the toreador Carrita (Frazer), and the Count de Morera (Foote) offers to introduce her if she will agree to attend his ball. At the ball Dolores dances for the guests, and then joins a party at a cabaret where she meets the great Carrita. Her family meanwhile is searching the city for her, her father Eduardo de Lisa (Lane), her brother Carlos (Hale), and her sweetheart Ralph Kellogg (Coleman), having just arrived from the United States. Her father enters the cabaret and Parola (Ware), a faded cabaret singer, recognizes him and invites him to her room. Dolores follows them and hears Parola accuse Carlos of being the father of her son. As Carlos turns and starts down the stairs, Parola attempts to kill him with a heavy lamp but Dolores grabs it. Parola then turns on the daughter, but she is saved by the toreador. Parola tells Carrita that Carlos is his father and urges him to avenge her. Carrita leaves and before he can carry out his purpose, Parola admits that she lied and was only attempting to blackmail Carlos, which saves him from death at the hands of the toreador. Dolores arrives home bedraggled and completely cured of her desire for excitement, bullfights, and underworld cabarets. She happily sinks into her American sweetheart's arms.

Cast
Mae Murray as Dolores de Lisa
Creighton Hale as Carlos de Lisa 
Charles Lane as Eduardo de Lisa
Emily Fitzroy as Marquesa de Lisa
Robert Frazer as Carrita
Vincent Coleman as Ralph Kellogg
Courtenay Foote as Count de Morera
Helen Ware as Parola
Frank Puglia as Nema

References

External links

Stills at silenthollywood.com

1922 films
1922 drama films
Silent American drama films
American silent feature films
American black-and-white films
Films directed by Robert Z. Leonard
Tiffany Pictures films
Metro Pictures films
1920s American films